Patrick Bergin (died 16 April 1991) was an Irish politician and trade union official. He was a Labour Party member of Seanad Éireann from 1954 to 1957. He was nominated by the Taoiseach to the 8th Seanad in 1954. He did not contest the 1957 Seanad election. He stood unsuccessfully for Dáil Éireann as a Labour Party candidate for the Carlow–Kilkenny constituency at the 1948 general election. His son is the actor Patrick Bergin.

References

Year of birth missing
1991 deaths
Labour Party (Ireland) senators
Members of the 8th Seanad
Irish trade unionists
Nominated members of Seanad Éireann